Emily Taheny (born 1978) is an Australian comedian, television actress and singer known for her multiple appearances on the sketch comedy television series Comedy Inc. from 2003 through 2007, her role as "Kat" on the 2009 series The Jesters, and as a regular cast member on long-running satirical news program Shaun Micallef's Mad as Hell.  She was born at Warooka, Yorke Peninsula, South Australia.

Career
Taheny began doing stand-up comedy in 1989. She graduated from the Centre for Performing Arts in South Australia and collaborated with her sister Fiona O'Loughlin on the stage show Fiona, Her Sister and Some Guy, which received the Best Newcomer Award at the Melbourne International Comedy Festival in 2001.

She has performed at the Adelaide Fringe Festival, Edinburgh Festival, and Melbourne Festival. She won the Fringe Cabaret Award at the Melbourne Festival in 2002 for her performance in Cliff Hanger. In 2003, she graduated from the College of Country Music in Tamworth, New South Wales.

Taheny made her television debut on Comedy Inc. in 2003, playing various characters on the show until its cancellation in 2007. In 2005, she made a guest appearance on Spicks and Specks. In 2006, she appeared on The Chaser's War on Everything, singing a song alongside Andrew Hansen's Crazy Warehouse character. She appeared as "Kat" in the 2009 television series The Jesters, and has appeared in the series Sleuth 101. From 2012 to 2022, she was a regular cast member on the Australian Broadcasting Corporation's satirical news program Shaun Micallef's Mad as Hell, playing numerous recurring and one-off characters, and she competed in a special Mad As Hell does Hard Quiz in 2022. In 2017, she appeared in the first episode of True Story with Hamish & Andy.

Filmography

Film

Television

Recognition

Awards and nominations
2001, won Best Newcomer Award at the Melbourne International Comedy Festival
2002, won Fringe Cabaret Award at the Melbourne Festival

References

External links

Official website

Australian television actresses
Australian women comedians
Australian people of Irish descent
Living people
1978 births